Anomiopus idei is a species of true dung beetle that is endemic to Perú, and is only known from its type locality in Loreto Region.

References

idei
Endemic fauna of Peru
Beetles described in 2006